The Maltese First Division Women's Volleyball Championship  is the most important national Volleyball competition organized by the Maltese Volleyball Association (MVA) among women in Malta since the year 1996.

Competition Formula
The first of the season 5 teams plays a preliminary round-robin tournament home and away, in which the top 4 teams in the ranking table will advance to the semis, in the Semifinals every two teams will play each other in best of three matches series and then in the final as well best of three matches will decide the champion.

Winners list

References

External links
   Maltese Volleyball Federation

Maltese League
Maltese League